The Book of Negroes is a 2015 television miniseries based on the 2007 novel of the same name by Canadian writer Lawrence Hill. The book was inspired by the British freeing and evacuation of former slaves, known as Black Loyalists, who had left rebel masters during the American Revolutionary War. The British transported some 3,000 Black Loyalists to Nova Scotia for resettlement, documenting their names in what was called the Book of Negroes.

The novel explores the life of a fictional woman included in this resettlement. She had been taken captive as a girl in West Africa and sold into slavery, held first in South Carolina. She escaped to British lines in New York City, where she was freed and ultimately evacuated to Nova Scotia. Clement Virgo and Hill collaborated on writing the six-part miniseries, with Virgo also directing.

The miniseries premiered on CBC in Canada on January 7, 2015, and on BET in the United States on February 16, 2015.

Synopsis
In 1761, eleven-year-old Aminata Diallo is abducted and taken captive from her village in West Africa by agents of the V.O.C., a Dutch trading company. She meets another boy from her region, Chekura, who is working for the slavers but reveals he was sold into slavery by his uncle. She and Chekura are transported by ship to be sold into slavery in South Carolina, where the two are separated and she is forced to work on an indigo plantation. Chekura later returns to her and the pair get married. Their baby is abducted and sold by Aminata's jealous slave master, Robinson Appleby. Aminata later tries to find her child and vows to return one day to her homeland.

Solomon Lindo, a sympathetic indigo inspector, buys Aminata from Appleby and takes her to New York, where she escapes to British lines as they control the city.

Amidst the American Revolutionary War, she is recruited by Sir John Clarkson to help register names of Black Loyalists in a ledger known as The Book of Negroes. It was a record of former slaves whom the British freed after they fled rebel masters and was prepared prior to their promised evacuation of Loyalists from the city to Nova Scotia after Britain's defeat in the war. They resettled Black Loyalists in the colony, granting them land.

Separated from her husband, Aminata encounters more hardship in Nova Scotia. The climate is harsh and tensions flare between the white and black communities over the scarcity of work, breaking out in the Shelburne Riots. Aminata successfully petitions British abolitionists, who organize passage from Nova Scotia to the new colony of Freetown (Sierra Leone) in West Africa for nearly 1,300 former slaves. With this voyage, Aminata returns to the continent of her homeland.

Events
As mentioned above, the novel is based on the historical document, the Book of Negroes, and related events of the period. Aminata is said to be Muslim, as were some slaves taken from West Africa; others followed indigenous religions. The history of Islam in Niger provides some context to this.

When the Patriots won the American Revolutionary War, many Loyalists, decided to leave the former Thirteen Colonies. Some had already lost property to rebel confiscation and been subject to persecution and attacks. The Crown promised them land grants in Nova Scotia and other British colonies; some Loyalists went to Jamaica. Tens of thousands of these refugees came through New York City, where their evacuation was processed by the British Army, leading up to Evacuation Day on 25 November 1783. The Book of Negroes was created to document the former slaves who were eligible to leave; it was assembled by Samuel Birch, the namesake of Birchtown, Nova Scotia, under the direction of Guy Carleton, 1st Baron Dorchester. (For more background, see Dunmore's Proclamation, a 1775 promise by the royal governor of the British Colony of Virginia to grant emancipation (freedom) to slaves who left rebel masters and joined the Crown's forces.)

The writers of the series based Aminata's first owner, Appleby, on a business partner of Henry Laurens, who headed one of the largest slave trading companies in the Thirteen Colonies. Solomon Lindo, the Jewish indigo inspector, was an ancestor of Chris Blackwell (born 1937), the British-Jamaican founder of Island Records. "Daddy Moses" was Moses Wilkinson. One of Aminata's supporters in New York Town is presented as  Samuel Fraunces, owner of the historic Fraunces Tavern.

The naval officer who helped the Black Loyalist community in Nova Scotia was John Clarkson, younger brother of the more well-known Thomas, one of the central figures in the abolition of slavery in England and the British Empire. Given the difficulties of former slaves in London and Nova Scotia, Thomas Clarkson and William Wilberforce, along with other members of the Society for Effecting the Abolition of the Slave Trade, had incorporated the Sierra Leone Company, to resettle some of these Black Loyalists in a new colony in West Africa.

Lieutenant Clarkson’s charge in Nova Scotia was to find volunteers for this resettlement. He worked with Thomas Peters, among other Black Loyalists. Together they gathered a group of close to 1,200 who wanted to leave for what they hoped were better opportunities in Sierra Leone.  After a harrowing transatlantic passage, the flotilla of 15 ships arrived at the colony's port in March 1792. This group, who became known as the Nova Scotian Settlers, established Freetown, the capital city.

Aminata's journey to London and publication of her memoir have precedents in the life stories, known as slave narratives, of such men as Ignatius Sancho and Olaudah Equiano. Her daughter's time in London as a domestic worker was based on the history of the Black Poor.

Development and production
The series was adapted from Hill's novel, named the Book of Negroes after the historical document recording names and descriptions of 3,000 African-American slaves who had escaped to the British lines during the American Revolution, were freed, and were to be evacuated by the British by ship to points in Nova Scotia. There they were to be granted land for new lives. Clement Virgo and series producer Damon D'Oliveira purchased the rights to Hill's novel in 2009 and began work on a feature film script. CBC and BET came on board in 2010 to develop the feature script as a six-part miniseries.

The international co-production began shooting in February 2014 in Cape Town, South Africa. Filming also took place in various locations around Nova Scotia, Canada. This included the Fortress of Louisbourg, used to portray 18th-century New York City and Canvas Town; Lunenburg harbour for the historic New York harbour, and Shelburne's Dock Street used as the scene of historic Shelburne.  Filming was completed by the beginning of June 2014.

Prior to its television debut, the series had special cinematic screenings at the Marché International des Programmes de Communication and the Canadian International Television Festival.

Cast

Episodes

Reception

Ratings
1.7 million Canadians tuned in to watch the first episode of The Book of Negroes, making it "the highest-rated original drama for the network since Road to Avonleas" January 7, 1990 premiere.

Reviews
Metacritic, which uses a weighted average, assigned a score of 77 out of 100 based on 9 reviews, indicating "generally favorable reviews."

Awards and nominations

See also

 List of films featuring slavery

References

External links
 
 

2010s Canadian television miniseries
2015 Canadian television series debuts
2015 Canadian television series endings
African-American genealogy
BET original programming
2010s Black Canadian television series
Black Loyalists
CBC Television original programming
Gemini and Canadian Screen Award for Best Television Film or Miniseries winners
Television series about the American Revolution
Television series based on novels
Television shows filmed in Nova Scotia
Television series set in the 18th century
Television shows filmed in South Africa
Television shows set in Africa
Television shows set in New York City
Television shows set in Nova Scotia
Television shows set in South Carolina
Works about American slavery
Works about Canada–United States relations